Crimson Springs is an unincorporated community in Monroe County, West Virginia, United States. Crimson Springs is south of Union.

References

Unincorporated communities in Monroe County, West Virginia
Unincorporated communities in West Virginia